Acritogramma metaleuca is a moth species in the family Erebidae. It is found in North America.

The MONA or Hodges number for Acritogramma metaleuca is 8682.

References

Further reading

 
 
 
 

Omopterini
Articles created by Qbugbot
Moths described in 1913